The triple test score (TTS) is a diagnostic tool for examining potentially cancerous breasts. Diagnostic accuracy of the triple test score is nearly 100%. Scoring includes using the procedures of physical examination, mammography and needle biopsy.  If the results of a TTS are greater than five, an excisional biopsy is indicated.

Scoring
To obtain the triple test score, a number from 1 through 3 is assigned to each one of the procedures. A score of 1 is assigned to a benign test result, 2 applies to a suspicious test result, and 3 applies to a malignant result. The sum of the scores of all three procedures is the triple test score.  A score of 3 to 4 is most likely benign, whereas a score of greater than 6 is possibly malignant.

References

Breast cancer